Lawrence E. Welch Jr.  is a Judge of the Nebraska Court of Appeals.

Education

Welch received his Bachelor of Science from Loyola Marymount University and his Juris Doctor from Creighton University School of Law.

Legal career

Prior to his appointment to the bench he was a partner Welch Law Firm, P.C.; prior to this, Welch worked as an associate attorney for Fraser, Stryker, Vaughn, Meusey, Olson, Boyer & Bloch, P.C.

Nebraska Court of Appeals service

On January 22, 2018 he was appointed to the Nebraska Court of Appeals by Governor Pete Ricketts, to the seat vacated by the retirement of Everett Inbody. He was sworn into office on March 18, 2018.

References

External links

Official Biography on Nebraska Judicial Branch website

Living people
Date of birth missing (living people)
Place of birth missing (living people)
Creighton University School of Law alumni
Loyola Marymount University alumni
Nebraska lawyers
21st-century American lawyers
21st-century American judges
Year of birth missing (living people)